Brian O'Driscoll is an Irish rugby union player who has 141 caps to his name; 133 for Ireland and 8 for the British & Irish Lions. He is currently the fourth most capped player in the world behind Richie McCaw, Sergio Parisse and Alun Wyn Jones. He earned his first Irish cap playing against Australia on the 12 June 1999 at Ballymore Stadium in Brisbane, before ending his international career on the 15 March 2014 against France at the Stade de France. In his 133 caps for Ireland, he has only played once of the bench; against Romania on 15 October 1999. In total, he has represented Ireland on 65 occasions in either the Five or Six Nations Championship, and have played in 4 Rugby World Cup tournaments, playing in 17 matches. He has scored 46 tries for his national side, a current record for the Irish team, and with his 5 drop goals, he has scored 245 points for Ireland.

In addition to Ireland, he also represented the British & Irish Lions on four tours. He earned his first Lions cap against Australia as part of the 2001 British & Irish Lions tour to Australia, where he played in every test match. He was named captain for the 2005 British & Irish Lions tour to New Zealand, but was injured just minutes into the opening test against the All Blacks. He made a formidable partnership with Welsh Centre Jamie Roberts on the 2009 British & Irish Lions tour to South Africa, playing in the opening two tests of the test series. Despite the expected retirement of O'Driscoll at the end of the 2012–13 season, O'Driscoll was selected for his fourth British and Irish Lion for the 2013 British & Irish Lions tour to Australia. On this tour, he played in the opening two test against the Wallabies, but was dropped for the final test, which led to much criticism for head coach Warren Gatland.

Key
 Comp denotes Competition/Tournament
 Pts denotes points
 Conv denotes Conversions
 Pen denotes Penalties
 Drop denotes Drop Goal
 Repl. denotes matches that O'Driscoll was replaced in a match.
 Won denotes that the match was won by the side O'Driscoll was playing for.
 Lost denotes that the match was lost by the side O'Driscoll was playing for.
 Draw denotes that the match was drawn.
 Matches in yellow denoted matches that O'Driscoll was captain.

International Caps

Overall

By country

By stadium

See also
 List of rugby union test caps leaders
 List of leading rugby union test try scorers
 List of leading international rugby union drop goal scorers

External links
 ESPN Scrum Profile
 Ireland Profile

Caps
O